Marta Tibor (born June 7, 1983 in Sombor, SR Serbia, Yugoslavia) is a Serbian sprint canoer who has competed since mid-2000s. She won a bronze medal in the K-4 200 m event at the 2007 ICF Canoe Sprint World Championships in Duisburg.

References

Living people
Serbian female canoeists
1983 births
Olympic canoeists of Serbia
Canoeists at the 2012 Summer Olympics
Sportspeople from Sombor
ICF Canoe Sprint World Championships medalists in kayak